Beijing Institute of Machinery (北京机械工业学院) is a university in Beijing, China. It was established in 1986.

One of the two universities that merged into Beijing Information Science & Technology University. Now, although the title of Beijing Institute of Machinery is no longer officially used, the school is  considered half of the newly founded institution, Beijing Information Science & Technology University. The university takes engineering as its main faculty combined with management, liberal and science programs.

External links
Official website

Universities and colleges in Beijing
Educational institutions established in 1986
1986 establishments in China